Konstantin Vitalievich Shafranov (born September 11, 1968) is a Kazakhstani former professional ice hockey player who played five games in the National Hockey League. He played for the St. Louis Blues. In 1996, he won the Gary F. Longman Memorial Trophy as the best rookie in the International Hockey League (IHL). Two years later he was named to the IHL's end of season all-star team, as the second best right-wing in the league.

He is currently the Fort Wayne Komets' Assistant Coach.

Career
A long time veteran with his hometown club Torpedo Ust-Kamenogorsk, Shafranov was drafted by the St. Louis Blues 229th overall in the 1996 NHL Entry Draft. He made an immediate impact in North America, scoring 46 goals with the Fort Wayne Komets of the International Hockey League, earning himself the title of rookie of the year and a spot on the IHL's second All-Star Team. The following season, he made his NHL debuts with the Blues, scoring twice and adding an assist in 5 games. It was however all for his NHL career; he did play a few more seasons in the American Hockey League and the IHL, but he never again had an impact such as that he had in his first season with Fort Wayne, which led him to go back in Europe, where the larger ice surfaces and more open play suited much better the goal scorer's style.

Shafranov took part in various competitions for the Kazakhstani National Team, totalling 43 games for the national squad.
He participated at the 2010 IIHF World Championship as a member of the Kazakhstan men's national ice hockey team.

Career statistics

Regular season and playoffs

International

Awards

References

External links

1968 births
Living people
Detroit Falcons (CoHL) players
Grand Rapids Griffins players
HC CSKA Moscow players
HC Sibir Novosibirsk players
Ice hockey players at the 1998 Winter Olympics
Ice hockey players at the 2006 Winter Olympics
Kazakhstani expatriate ice hockey people
Kazakhstani ice hockey right wingers
Kazakhstani people of Russian descent
Kazzinc-Torpedo players
Metallurg Magnitogorsk players
Olympic ice hockey players of Kazakhstan
Sportspeople from Oskemen
Providence Bruins players
Soviet ice hockey right wingers
St. Louis Blues draft picks
St. Louis Blues players
Torpedo Nizhny Novgorod players
Worcester IceCats players
Kazakhstani expatriate sportspeople in the United States
Kazakhstani expatriate sportspeople in Russia
Expatriate ice hockey players in the United States
Expatriate ice hockey players in Russia
Kazakhstani ice hockey coaches